For other instances of Hico, see: Hico (disambiguation)

Hico is a small city located in Hamilton County in central Texas, United States.

Named for its founder's hometown of Hico in southwestern Kentucky, Hico's original location was on Honey Creek. When the Texas Central line (part of the historic Katy Railroad) was built nearby, the citizens moved  to the rail line. Hico was incorporated in 1883 and became the Hamilton County shipping center. Over the years, it became a cattle and cotton market. Today, ranching and tourism dominate the local economy.

In 1903, Kentucky-based evangelist Mordecai Ham held the first of his 75 Texas revival meetings in Hico. There were 150 professions of faith in Jesus Christ.

"Brushy Bill" Roberts and Billy the Kid

Roberts' grave has not been revealed, thus preventing DNA authentication of the remains.

The Hico community

Hico hosts the Annual Texas Steak Cookoff in May. It boasts thousands of guests every year.

Geography

Hico is located in the northern corner of Hamilton County at  (31.984410, –98.030508). A small portion of the city extends north into Erath County. U.S. Route 281 passes through the city as Walnut Street and North 2nd Street. Highway 281 leads northwest  to Stephenville and south  to Hamilton, the county seat. Texas State Highway 6 passes through the city as Second Street, joining US 281 as it exits the city to the northwest. Highway 6 leads east  to Meridian and west-northwest  to Dublin.

Demographics

2020 census

As of the 2020 United States census, there were 1,335 people, 619 households, and 269 families residing in the city.

2000 census
As of the census of 2000, there were 1,341 people, 556 households, and 363 families residing in the city. The population density was 911.4 people per square mile (352.2/km2). There were 640 housing units at an average density of 435.0 per square mile (168.1/km2). The racial makeup of the city was 90.23% White, 0.82% Native American, 0.15% Pacific Islander, 7.53% from other races, and 1.27% from two or more races. Hispanic or Latino of any race were 11.26% of the population.

There were 556 households, out of which 30.8% had children under the age of 18 living with them, 51.4% were married couples living together, 10.6% had a female householder with no husband present, and 34.7% were non-families. 31.5% of all households were made up of individuals, and 22.3% had someone living alone who was 65 years of age or older. The average household size was 2.37 and the average family size was 2.99.

In the city, the population was spread out, with 26.2% under the age of 18, 6.9% from 18 to 24, 23.8% from 25 to 44, 20.5% from 45 to 64, and 22.6% who were 65 years of age or older. The median age was 40 years. For every 100 females, there were 82.9 males. For every 100 females age 18 and over, there were 77.9 males.

The median income for a household in the city was $25,919, and the median income for a family was $34,688. Males had a median income of $27,404 versus $17,708 for females. The per capita income for the city was $14,122. About 13.6% of families and 19.5% of the population were below the poverty line, including 27.2% of those under age 18 and 22.4% of those age 65 or over.

Education
The city is served by the Hico Independent School District, home of the Hico Tigers and Lady Tigers.

Climate
The climate in this area is characterized by hot, humid summers and generally mild to cool winters. According to the Köppen Climate Classification system, Hico has a humid subtropical climate, abbreviated "Cfa" on climate maps.

Notable people

 Mary Charlotte Ward Granniss Webster Billings, Texas' first woman Universalist minister. She resided here for many years and died in 1904
 Major General William F. Garrison (Ret.), Best known for being the commander of Task Force Ranger during Operation Gothic Serpent in Mogadishu, Somalia in 1993, resides at his ranch near Hico with his family
 Brushy Bill Roberts 1879–1950 - claimed to be Billy The Kid
 Mattie Parker, mayor of Fort Worth, Texas (2021–present) was born and raised in Hico

Hico gallery

See also

 List of cities in Texas

References

External links

 City of Hico official website

Cities in Hamilton County, Texas
Cities in Erath County, Texas
Cities in Texas